Natalina Bonardi (4 December 1864 – 25 July 1945) – born Maria – was a Roman Catholic nun and mother superior who is known for her humility and heroic virtue. She also helped to form the Sisters of Santa Maria di Loreto in Italy. She was proclaimed as Venerable on 25 November 2021 by Pope Francis.

Early life
Natalina was born in Cuneo, Italy on 4 December 1864, among several siblings to Giuseppe and Margherita Dogliani, a wealthy, Roman Catholic family. Natalina was baptized in Sant'Ambrogio Church in Cuneo on December 7, 1864 and originally was given the name Maria. In 1871 in the same church, she received her first communion and was later confirmed. Later that year, the family fell into financial ruin after her father was scammed of his fortune.

In 1873, her mother sent Maria to boarding school the Collegio della Sacra Famiglia in Cuneo. In 1878 at age of 14 Maria received a dream  that inspired her to dedicated her life to the service of God.

In 1880,  Maria returned home and took a job with a wealthy family to help her family recoup their losses due to the earlier financial crisis. She was already living as a nun even though she had not yet been instructed in religious devotion.

Religious calling

In 1882, Maria truly began to seek a life in service to God and entered the Sisters of Good Counsel and took the name Sr. Natalina. However, her first experience as a nun was rather difficult and confusing. Sr. Natalina and some other sisters of the Counsel were sent to a different town to teach children. However, soon after, Lorenzo Pampiro, the Archbishop of Vercelli, dissolved the order. (There are no records describing why it was dissolved.)

Sisters of S. Maria do Loreto

Eventually, the archbishop formed an order called of Sisters of S. Maria di Loreto Sant'Antonino which was dedicated to teaching children and the surrounding communities and "with the aim to re-propose the simple and humble, hardworking and contemplative lifestyle, led by Jesus, Mary and Joseph in the Holy House of Nazareth, which devotion and faith venerate in the miraculous House of the Virgin transported to Loreto." Natalina became superior and also worked with the elderly and did odd jobs such as teaching sewing, teaching drama and even spent time begging if the moment called for it. Her parents instilled hard work in their children and Maria believed in donating her time to help those young and old. The buildings she spent praying and helping the community still stand today.

After transferring the order to Vercelli with the approval of the Archbishop, Natalina found herself at odds with the parish priest and some of the older sisters of the order. In 1913, she resigned (twice) and it was finally accepted in 1914 whereupon she was assigned as superior and Director of the asylum at  Santa Maria Rocca in Cuneo.

Death

Natalina made her perpetual vows in 1938 along with 66 fellow nuns. She died 25 July 1945 in Vercelli, Italy. Her last years were spent in quiet solitude and prayer.

Veneration

Natalina Bonardi was venerated by Pope Francis on 25 November 2021 for her heroic virtue and for founding the Congregation of the Sisters of Saint Mary of Loreto.

References

1864 births
1945 deaths
People from Cuneo
19th-century Italian Roman Catholic religious sisters and nuns
20th-century Italian Roman Catholic religious sisters and nuns
19th-century venerated Christians
20th-century venerated Christians
Venerated Catholics by Pope Francis